In complex analysis, a field in mathematics, the Remmert–Stein theorem, introduced by , gives conditions for the closure of an analytic set to be analytic.

The theorem states that if F is an analytic set of dimension less than k in some complex manifold D, and M is an analytic subset of D – F with all components of dimension at least k, then the closure of M is either analytic or contains F.

The condition on the dimensions is necessary: for example, the set of points (1/n,0) in the complex plane is analytic in the complex plane minus the origin, but its closure in the complex plane is not.

Relations to other theorems

A consequence of the Remmert–Stein theorem (also treated in their paper), is Chow's theorem stating that any projective complex analytic space is necessarily a projective algebraic variety.

References

Complex manifolds
Theorems in complex analysis